Roberto Fernández Sastre (born 1951) is an Uruguayan writer, critic and musician. Born in Montevideo, he moved permanently to Barcelona in 1981. His novel  was nominated for the Premio Herralde in 1986; he was also nominated the following year for El turismo infame.

Fernández Sastre is also an accomplished drummer.

References

Uruguayan male writers
1951 births
Living people
Date of birth missing (living people)
Uruguayan male musicians